Urophlyctis leproides is a fungus that is a plant pathogen infecting beet.

References

External links 
 Index Fungorum
 USDA ARS Fungal Database

Fungal plant pathogens and diseases
Food plant pathogens and diseases
Blastocladiomycota